The river Jeetzel, which begins in the Altmark under the name Jeetze, flows from Saxony-Anhalt through Lower Saxony, in Germany. From its source near the village of Dönitz, it flows north through Beetzendorf, Salzwedel, Wustrow, Lüchow and Dannenberg, before joining the Elbe in Hitzacker.

A left tributary of the Elbe, the Jeetzel has itself several tributaries, including the Salzwedel Dumme and the Wustrow Dumme. The name is Slavic, and means ash (tree)-stream.

Historically, when the Elbe rose too high, it would flooded the Jeetzel, which flowed "backwards" and flooded the surrounding area. Today, a system of canals prevents such flooding.

See also
List of rivers of Saxony-Anhalt
List of rivers of Lower Saxony

References

 
Rivers of Saxony-Anhalt
Rivers of Lower Saxony
Federal waterways in Germany
Rivers of Germany